Sir David Hunt  (25 September 1913 – 30 July 1998) was a British diplomat, perhaps best remembered as winner of the BBC's Mastermind television quiz in 1977.

Life and career 
Hunt was born in Durham, and studied at Wadham College, Oxford. He served with distinction in World War II, and entered the diplomatic service in 1947. He served as Private Secretary to prime ministers Clement Attlee and Winston Churchill, and was knighted in 1963. From 1965 to 1967 he was the British High Commissioner to Cyprus.

From 1967 to 1969, he served as High Commissioner to Nigeria. Frederick Forsyth, then a journalist in Nigeria and later a successful novelist, described Hunt as "a snob and a racist" representing the diplomatic corps whose "blithering incompetence" failed to appreciate or deal with the tensions that erupted into the Nigerian Civil War. Forsyth claimed that Hunt was responsible for Britain's complete misreading of the war, contributing to the deaths of millions of Biafrans, particularly starving children.

Subsequently, beginning in 1969, Hunt was British Ambassador to Brazil, retiring in 1973.

Hunt won the Mastermind title in 1977 and was runner-up in the Mastermind International of 1979.

In 1982, a Champion of Champions tournament among the first ten Mastermind champions was televised. Hunt won the overall title.

Publications
Hunt had a number of books published:

 A revised edition of the two books A Don at war and On the spot: an ambassador remembers.
. Co-authored with J.N. Coldstream

Sources

1913 births
1998 deaths
Military personnel from County Durham
British Army officers
Alumni of Wadham College, Oxford
British Army personnel of World War II
Ambassadors of the United Kingdom to Brazil
Contestants on British game shows
High Commissioners of the United Kingdom to Cyprus
High Commissioners of the United Kingdom to Nigeria
Knights Commander of the Order of St Michael and St George
Officers of the Order of the British Empire